Thomas Briggs may refer to:

 Thomas Briggs (coach), American football coach
 Thomas Briggs (Royal Navy officer) (1780–1852), British naval officer
 Thomas Briggs (died 1864), British banker, murdered by Franz Müller
 Tommy Briggs (1923–1984), footballer
 Sir Thomas Graham Briggs (1833–1887), of the Briggs baronets, member of the Executive Council of Barbados

See also
 Tom Briggs (disambiguation)